Jully Luciano da Silva (born 18 April 1999), simply known as Jully, is a Brazilian professional footballer who plays as a goalkeeper for Santos and the Brazil women's national team.

Club career
Born in Niterói, Rio de Janeiro, Jully began her career at Vasco da Gama's youth setup in 2013, aged 13. In 2017, she moved to Avaí/Kindermann, but played mainly with the reserve team .

In 2019, Jully signed for Palmeiras. A backup to Vivi Holzel, she became a first-choice in the 2021 season onwards, and won the 2022 Copa Libertadores Femenina as a first-choice.

On 11 January 2023, Jully was announced as the new signing of Santos.

International career
Jully was a part of the Brazil under-20 squad in the 2018 FIFA U-20 Women's World Cup, but was only a backup option. She received her first call-up for the full side in February 2022.

Honours
Palmeiras
Copa Libertadores Femenina: 2022

References

1999 births
Living people
Sportspeople from Niterói
Brazilian women's footballers
Women's association football goalkeepers
Campeonato Brasileiro de Futebol Feminino Série A1 players
Sociedade Esportiva Palmeiras (women) players
Santos FC (women) players